Zabrachia is a genus of soldier flies in the family Stratiomyidae.  Adults can be distinguished from other Pachygastrinae by the fused R4 and R5 wing veins. Females have been collected during oviposition into pine wood, and larvae are known to live under the bark of coniferous trees, including lodgepole pine, ponderosa pine, and Douglas fir.

Species
Zabrachia albipilum Kraft & Cook, 1961
Zabrachia annulifemur Brunetti, 1920
Zabrachia barbata James, 1980
Zabrachia beameri Kraft & Cook, 1961
Zabrachia hebicornutum Kraft & Cook, 1961
Zabrachia knowltoni Kraft & Cook, 1961
Zabrachia latigena James, 1980
Zabrachia lopha Kraft & Cook, 1961
Zabrachia madagascariensis Lindner, 1959
Zabrachia magnicornis Cresson, 1919
Zabrachia mexicana James, 1980
Zabrachia minutissima (Zetterstedt, 1838)
Zabrachia occidentalis Rozkošný & Báez, 1983
Zabrachia parvum Kraft & Cook, 1961
Zabrachia plicatum Kraft & Cook, 1961
Zabrachia polita Coquillett, 1901
Zabrachia pusilla James, 1980
Zabrachia stoichoides James, 1965
Zabrachia tenella (Jaennicke, 1866)
Zabrachia yuccae James, 1965

References

Stratiomyidae
Brachycera genera
Taxa named by Daniel William Coquillett
Diptera of Asia
Diptera of Europe
Diptera of North America